The 1931–32 season was Blackpool F.C.'s 31st season (28th consecutive) in the Football League. They competed in the 22-team Division One, then the top tier of English football, finishing twentieth.

Jimmy Hampson was the club's top scorer for the fifth consecutive season, with 24 goals in total (23 in the league and one in the FA Cup).

Table

Notes

References

Blackpool F.C.
Blackpool F.C. seasons